Sartory-Saal is a concert hall located in Innenstadt, Cologne, Germany. It has a capacity of 1,400 people. Notable past performers include Weather Report, Aerosmith, Def Leppard, Whitesnake, Queen, AC/DC and Judas Priest.

References

External links
Official Website

Concert halls in Germany
Music in Cologne